Gulbadam Babamuratova (Turkmen Cyrillic: Гулбадам Бабамуратова; born 24 August 1991) is a Turkmenistan judoka and sambo in the category up to 52 kg. International Master of Sports.

Biography 
Gulbadam Babamuratova attended the National Institute of Sports and Tourism. Coaches - Çemengül Geldybaýewa and Dörtguly Tejenow.

In 2012, at the 36th World Sambo Championship in Minsk, she became the world champion in the up to 52 kg weight category. In December 2012, she won the gold medal of the World Cup in Sambo.

In 2013, she won a gold medal in wrestling on belts and bronze in sambo (52 kg) at the Universiade in Kazan.

In June 2014, she won a gold medal at the Asian Championship in sport and combat sambo in Tashkent. At the 2014 Asian Games in Incheon, she won the a silver medal. At the  2014 Asian Beach Games, she won gold and silver medals.

At October 2015 Babamuratova win  first ever judo grand prix gold medal for Turkmenistan at 3rd Judo grand prix in Tashkent, she beat at  52 kilo crown finalist Maria Ertl from Germany.

She was selected to compete at the 2020 Olympic Games and drawn against Gili Cohen in the first round.

Recognition 
 Order for Great Love for Independent Turkmenistan (2017)

References

External links
 
 
 Profile - Kazan 2013
 Profile - Phuket 2014

1991 births
Living people
People from Türkmenabat
Turkmenistan female judoka
Turkmenistan female sport wrestlers
Asian Games medalists in judo
Judoka at the 2010 Asian Games
Judoka at the 2014 Asian Games
Judoka at the 2018 Asian Games
Judoka at the 2016 Summer Olympics
Olympic judoka of Turkmenistan
Medalists at the 2014 Asian Games
Asian Games silver medalists for Turkmenistan
Medalists at the 2013 Summer Universiade
Judoka at the 2020 Summer Olympics